Helena Mannervesi (born 1946) is a Finnish orienteering competitor. She received a silver medal in the relay event at the 1981 World Orienteering Championships in Thun together with Marita Ruoho, Liisa Veijalainen and Outi Borgenström.

See also
 Finnish orienteers
 List of orienteers
 List of orienteering events

References

1946 births
Living people
Finnish orienteers
Female orienteers
Foot orienteers
World Orienteering Championships medalists